Adriana Vilagoš (born 2 January 2004) is a Serbian athlete who specializes in the javelin throw. At the age of 18, she won the silver medal at the 2022 European Athletics Championships, becoming the youngest ever European medallist in a throwing event. One year prior, Vilagoš was for the first time the World Under-20 Champion and earned a silver at the European U20 Championships to successfully defend her World U20 title in 2022, breaking championship and European U20 records in the process.

Early life and background
Adriana Vilagoš was raised in Mali Iđoš in north Serbia. She started out when she was a kid by playing handball and throwing a vortex – a small, egg shaped foam missile with an aerodynamic tail.

She has been coached from the beginning by her mother Đerđi, originally a handball coach and a public prosecutor. They watched YouTube videos to learn the technique (by men’s world record-holder Jan Železný among others).

Career
In 2018, only 14, Adriana threw a Serbian under-18 (javelin 500 g) record of 59.69 m, which she improved to 64.73 m a year later.

In March 2020, she set a world under-18 best with a throw of 68.76 m in Sremska Mitrovica, breaking 2019 record of Elina Tzengko (65.90 m), her two years older rival from Greece.

At the 2021 Balkan Athletics Championships held in Smederevo, Serbia in June, Vilagoš lost only to Tzengko to take the silver medal. This result of their competition was repeated in July at the European Athletics U20 Championships in Tallinn, Estonia. On 14 August at the Balkan U18 Championships in Kraljevo, Adriana bettered her world under-18 best with a 70.10 m performance, becoming the first U18 woman in history to break the 70-metre barrier. Just five days later, she beat Tzengko to gold for the first time at the World U20 Championships held in Nairobi, Kenya, setting a national U20 record.

In 2022, the 18-year-old placed in the top three in 15 of her 16 competitions, consistently throwing beyond 60 metres and finishing ahead of experienced senior opponents. She won for the second consecutive time U23 competition of the European Throwing Cup, triumphed in the Balkan Championships, Mediterranean Games, and captured decisively her second world u20 title at the World U20 Championships staged in Cali, Colombia, setting a championship and European U20 record of 63.52 m. She placed second behind only Tzengko and ahead of great Barbora Špotáková at her first senior European Championships Munich 2022. Adriana achieved 11 world's best U20 performances of the season, and was voted World Athletics Female Rising Start of the Year.

International competitions

See also
List of European under-18 bests in athletics
List of world under-18 bests in athletics
List of European under-20 records in athletics

References

External links

 

Living people
2004 births
People from Mali Iđoš
Serbian female javelin throwers
World Athletics U20 Championships winners
Hungarians in Vojvodina
21st-century Serbian women
Athletes (track and field) at the 2022 Mediterranean Games
Mediterranean Games gold medalists for Serbia
Mediterranean Games gold medalists in athletics
European Athletics Championships medalists